Midnight Trains is a French start-up railway company. The company aims to expand sleeper train services in Europe.

The first route is expected to open in 2024, with a fully operational network by 2030. Routes are planned from Paris to Spain, Italy, Portugal, Germany, Denmark and Scotland.

It was founded by Adrien Aumont and Romain Payet, the founders French crowdfunding website KissKissBankBank. Yorgo Tloupas,  associate artistic director, and Hervé Marro, director of communication and institutional relations, have also joined the company.

References

External links
 Midnight Trains official website

Railway companies of France
Night trains